Dilochiopsis is a genus of orchids. It was previously considered as a synonym of the genus Eria, but eventually it has become an accepted name. At present (June 2014), there is only one known species, Dilochiopsis scortechinii, endemic to peninsular Malaysia.

References 

  (2006). Epidendroideae (Part One). Genera Orchidacearum 4: 556 ff. Oxford University Press.

External links 

Podochileae genera
Eriinae
Orchids of Malaysia
Monotypic Epidendroideae genera